In a number of countries, plants have been chosen as symbols to represent specific geographic areas. Some countries have a country-wide floral emblem; others in addition have symbols representing subdivisions. Different processes have been used to adopt these symbols – some are conferred by government bodies, whereas others are the result of informal public polls. The term floral emblem, which refers to flowers specifically, is primarily used in Australia and Canada. In the United States, the term state flower is more often used.

National plants

Africa

Mauritius 
The national flower of Mauritius is Trochetia boutoniana.

Seychelles 
The national flower of the Seychelles is the tropicbird orchid (known locally as orkid payanke), Angraecum eburneum.

South Africa 
The national flower of South Africa is the King Protea, Protea cynaroides.

Tunisia 
The national flower of Tunisia is jasmine. It was chosen as a symbol for the 2010 Tunisian Revolution.

Asia

Bangladesh
The national flower of Bangladesh is the water lily Nymphaea nouchali. It is called Shapla (শাপলা) in the Bengali language.

Bhutan
The national flower of Bhutan is the blue poppy. Previously misidentified as the non-native Meconopsis grandis, national flower of Bhutan was identified in 2017 as Meconopsis gakyidiana, a new distinct species.

Brunei
The national flower of Brunei is Simpoh Ayer (Dillenia suffruticosa).

Cambodia

Cambodia formally adopted the romduol as its national flower in the year 2005 by a royal decree. The royal decree designates the taxon as Mitrella mesnyi, however, this is a taxonomically illegitimate synonym for Sphaerocoryne affinis.

Hong Kong
The symbolic flower of Hong Kong is the Hong Kong orchid tree ("洋紫荊"), Bauhinia blakeana.

India
The national flower of India is the lotus flower (Nelumbo nucifera). It is a sacred flower and occupies a unique position in the art and mythology of ancient India and has been an auspicious symbol of Indian culture since time immemorial.

Indonesia

There are three types of floral emblems used to symbolize Indonesia: 
 The puspa bangsa ("national flower") of Indonesia is melati (Jasminum sambac).
 The puspa pesona ("flower of charm") is anggrek bulan or moon orchid (Phalaenopsis amabilis).
 The puspa langka ("rare flower") is padma raksasa rafflesia (Rafflesia arnoldii).

All three were chosen on World Environment Day in 1990, and enforced by law through Presidential Decree (Keputusan Presiden) No. 4 1993, On the other occasion, Bunga Bangkai (Titan arum) was also added as puspa langka together with Rafflesia.

Melati (Jasminum sambac), a small white flower with sweet fragrance, has long been considered a sacred flower in Indonesian tradition, as it symbolizes purity, sacredness, graceful simplicity and sincerity. For example, on her wedding day, a traditional Indonesian bride's hair is often adorned with arrangements of jasmine, while the groom's kris is often adorned with a lock of jasmine. However, jasmine is also often used as a floral offering for spirits and deities, and also often present during funerals, which has caused it to be seen as having mystical and sacred properties. Moon orchid was chosen for its beauty, while the other two rare flowers, Rafflesia arnoldii and Titan arum, were chosen to demonstrate uniqueness and Indonesia's rich biodiversity.

Each of the 34 provinces of Indonesia also has a native plant as its provincial flower.

Iran

The national flower of Iran is the water lily which is also called nymphaea (Niloofare Abi, in Persian). The flower is the national flower of Iran since the Achaemenid Empire era (552 BC).

Israel

The national flower of Israel is the poppy anemone (Anemone coronaria; calanit metzuya in Hebrew), chosen in 2013 to replace Cyclamen persicum.

Jordan 
The national flower of Jordan is Black iris (Iris nigricans).

Laos
The national flower of Laos is the plumeria (champa), despite it no longer being endemic.

Malaysia

The national flower of Malaysia is the bunga raya (Chinese hibiscus, Hibiscus rosa-sinensis).

Maldives
The national flower of the Maldives is the pink polyantha rose (Rosa polyantha), called fiyaathoshi finifenmaa.

Mongolia
The national flower of Mongolia is Scabiosa comosa (ber tsetseg).

Myanmar
The national flower of Myanmar is Pterocarpus indicus (paduak).

Nepal

The national flower of Nepal is the rhododendron.

North Korea
The national flower of North Korea is the Korean mountain magnolia (Magnolia sieboldii, Korean: 목란/ mongnan).

Pakistan

The national flower of Pakistan is common jasmine also known as Jasminum officinale.

Philippines 
The Philippines adopted the sampaguita (Arabian jasmine, Jasminum sambac) in 1934 as its national flower because it symbolises purity and cleanliness due to its colour and sweet smell. It is popularly strung into garlands that are presented to visitors and dignitaries, and is a common offering to religious images.

Sampaguita in Filipino language is a direct loan word from the Indian sanskrit word "campaka". Plants of some species of flowers like sampaguita, fruits like mango and nangka, vegetables like ampalaya, patola, malunggay, name of Philippine's pre-Christian chief god Bathala (from sanskrit Bhattara Guru),  came from India during pre-Spanish Indianised trade and influences. Among strong traces of continuity of Hindu influence in Philippines are placing of sampaguita garland around the neck of visitors to show hospitality and friendship, throwing the rice over bride and groom for prosperity, performing paninilbihan, paying dowry, visiting a shrine to pray for fertility, etc.

Singapore 
The national flower of Singapore is a hybrid orchid cultivar known as the Singapore orchid or Vanda Miss Joaquim (Papilionanthe teres × Papilionanthe hookeriana).

South Korea 
The national flower of South Korea is Hibiscus syriacus. Known in South Korea as mugunghwa (Korean: 무궁화), the flower's symbolism relates to the Korean word mugung, which means "eternity" or "inexhaustible abundance". Despite being made the national flower officially after Korea regained its independence from Japan, mugunghwa has been associated with Korean culture for many centuries, with the Silla kingdom having called itself the "Country of the Mugunghwa" (Korean: 근화향, Romanized: Geunhwahyang).

Sri Lanka

The national flower of Sri Lanka is Nil mānel (නිල් මානෙල්), the blue-star water-lily (Nymphaea stellata). Although nil means "blue" in Sinhala, the Sinhalese name of this plant is often rendered as "water-lily" in English. This beautiful aquatic flower appears in the Sigiriya frescoes and has been mentioned in ancient Sanskrit, Pali and Sinhala literary works. Buddhist lore in Sri Lanka claims that this flower was one of the 108 auspicious signs found on Prince Siddhartha's footprint.

Taiwan

The national flower of the Republic of China was officially designated as the plum blossom by the Executive Yuan on 21 July 1964. The plum blossom, known as the meihua, is a symbol of resilience and perseverance in the face of adversity, because plum trees often bloom most vibrantly even during the harshest winters. The triple grouping of stamens represents Dr. Sun Yat-sen's Three Principles of the People, while the five petals symbolize the five branches of the government.

Thailand
The national flower of Thailand is the Golden Shower Tree (Cassia fistula), locally known as dok khuen or rachapruek.

Europe

Andorra
Andorra– Narcissus poeticus

Austria
The national flower of Austria is edelweiss (Leontopodium nivale).

Belgium
Brussels – Iris pseudacorus
Flanders – poppy
Wallonia – Gaillardia

Bulgaria
Bulgaria – rose

Croatia
Croatia – Iris croatica (unofficial)

Cyprus
Cyprus – Cyclamen cyprium

Czech Republic 
Czech Republic – Tilia

Denmark
Denmark – red clover (Trifolium pratense) and marguerite daisy (Argyranthemum frutescens). The latter is often modified to oxeye daisy (Leucanthemum vulgare), a rather similar species that is native to the country (the marguerite daisy is not)

Estonia
Estonia – cornflower

Finland
Finland – lily of the valley

France
France – Iris sibirica
Brittany – Ulex and heather

Guernsey
Guernsey – Nerine sarniensis

Iceland
Iceland – White dryad (Dryas octopetala)

Lithuania
Lithuania – Ruta graveolens

Northern Ireland
 Northern Ireland – flax flower, clover leaf

Poland
Poland – red poppy
Kashubia – Kashubian vetch

Portugal
Portugal does not officially have a national flower, though the lavender is commonly cited. The carnation (Dianthus caryophyllus) is also a symbol of the nation's triumph against the authoritarian far-right Estado Novo dictatorship, known as the Carnation Revolution.

Romania
Romania – peony

Russia
Russia – chamomile

Serbia

The national flowers of Serbia are Natalie's ramonda (Ramonda nathaliae) and Serbian ramonda (Ramonda serbica). The flowers are considered symbolс of the Serbian Army's struggle during World War I, as well as the resurrection of the Serbian state after the devastating war. To commemorate their victims, people in Serbia wear Natalie's ramonda as a symbol of remembrance, especially during Armistice Day, which is a statutory holiday in Serbia since 2012. Natalie's ramonda was named after Queen Natalija Obrenović, while Serbian ramonda is also known as the Serbian phoenix flower, due to its ability to be revived when watered, even when fully dehydrated.

Slovakia
 Slovakia – Tilia

Spain
Spain – Dianthus caryophyllus

Sweden
The national flower of Sweden is Campanula rotundifolia. It won a public vote in 2021.

Switzerland
The national flower of Switzerland is edelweiss (Leontopodium nivale).

United Kingdom

Each of the United Kingdom's four constituent countries has one or more national flower:
 England – Tudor rose
 Wales – daffodil, leek
 Northern Ireland – flax flower, clover leaf
 Scotland – thistle, Scots pine

Ukraine
Ukraine – sunflower

North America

Canada
The maple leaf is widely used as a symbol for Canada. The maple tree was officially recognized as Canada's arboreal emblem in 1996.

Canada's provinces and territories also have official provincial or territorial floral emblems:
 Ontario: white trillium (Trillium grandiflorum), adopted in 1937.
 Quebec: blue flag (Iris versicolor), adopted in November 1999.
 Nova Scotia: mayflower (Epigea repens), adopted in 1901.
 New Brunswick: purple violet (Viola cucullata), adopted in 1936.
 Manitoba: prairie crocus (Pulsatilla ludoviciana), adopted in 1906.
 British Columbia: Pacific dogwood (Cornus nuttallii), adopted in 1956.
 Prince Edward Island: lady's slipper (Cypripedium acaule), a species of orchid, adopted in 1947.
 Saskatchewan: western red lily (Lilium philadelphicum var. andinum), adopted in 1941.
 Alberta: wild rose (Rosa acicularis), also known as the prickly rose, adopted in 1930.
 Newfoundland and Labrador: northern pitcher plant (Sarracenia purpurea), adopted in 1954. It was first chosen as a symbol of Newfoundland by Queen Victoria, and was used on the island's coinage until 1938.
 Northwest Territories: mountain avens (Dryas octopetala), adopted in 1957.
 Yukon: fireweed (Epilobium angustifolium), adopted in 1957.
 Nunavut: purple saxifrage (Saxifraga oppositifolia), unanimously adopted by the Legislative Assembly of Nunavut on May 1, 2000.

Many Canadian flags and coats-of-arms have floral emblems on them. The flag of Montreal has four floral emblems. On the right side of the flag of Saskatchewan overlapping both green and gold halves is the western red lily, the provincial floral emblem. The coat of arms of Port Coquitlam has the city's floral emblem, the azalea, displayed on a collar. The coat of arms of Prince Edward Island displays lady's slippers, the floral emblem of the island. When coat of arms of Nova Scotia were reassumed in 1929, the trailing arbutus or mayflower, the floral emblem of Nova Scotia, was added.

Mexico
The national flower of Mexico is the dahlia (Dahlia pinnata).

United States
In 1986, President Ronald Reagan signed legislation to make the rose the national floral emblem of the United States. In each of the U.S. states, state flowers and trees have also been adopted as symbols by state legislatures.

Central America and the Caribbean

Antigua and Barbuda
The national flower of Antigua and Barbuda is Agave karatto, also known as "dagger log" or "batta log".

The Bahamas

The national flower of the Bahamas is the Yellow Elder (Tecoma stans).

Barbados
The national flower of Barbados is known locally as the Pride of Barbados (Caesalpinia pulcherrima).

Belize
The national flower of Belize is the black orchid (Prosthechea cochleata).

Costa Rica
The national flower of Costa Rica is the guaria morada (Guarianthe skinneri).

Cuba

The national flower of Cuba since October 13, 1936, is the white ginger lily.

Dominica
The national flower of Dominica is Sabinea carinalis, commonly known as Carib wood or Bois Caraibe.

Dominican Republic

The Dominican Republic's national flower was originally the flower of the caoba (mahogany tree, Swietenia mahagoni). In 2011, the mahogany was dubbed the national tree, vacating the national flower spot for the Bayahibe rose (Pereskia quisqueyana) in order to bring attention to its conservation.

Guatemala 
The national flower of Guatemala is the monja blanca (Lycaste skinneri var. alba).

Haiti

The national flower of Haiti is the Choeblack or rose kayenn (Hibiscus).

Honduras
The national flower of Honduras is the orchid Rhyncholaelia digbyana.

Jamaica
The national flower of Jamaica is the lignum vitae (Guaiacum officinale).

Oceania

Australia
Golden Wattle (Acacia pycnantha) was officially proclaimed the floral emblem of Australia on 1 September 1988.

French Polynesia
The Tahitian gardenia (tiare flower) is the national flower of Tahiti, French Polynesia, and the Cook Islands.

Fiji
The national flower of Fiji is tagimaucia (Medinilla waterhousei), a vine with red and white flowers endemic to the highlands of the island of Taveuni.

New Zealand
New Zealand does not have an official national flower, but the silver fern (foliage) is acknowledged as its national emblem. The Kowhai (Sophora spp., native trees with yellow cascading flowers) is usually regarded as the national flower. Other plant emblems are Koru (a curled fern symbol) and the crimson-flowered Pohutukawa (Metrosideros excelsa), also called New Zealand's Christmas tree.

Tonga
The heilala (Garcinia sessilis) is Tonga's national flower. The name of Tonga's beauty pageant, the Heilala Festival, is taken from this flower. Resorts as well as consumer products are also often named after this flower, such as the Heilala Lodge and Heilala Vanilla. The flower is also used in Tonga for medicinal and ornamental purposes.

South America

Argentina

The national flower of Argentina is the flower of the ceibo tree (Erythrina crista-galli), also known as seibo or bucaré.

Bolivia
Bolivia has two national flowers: the kantuta (Cantua buxifolia) and patujú (Heliconia rostrata).

Brazil
The national flower of Brazil is the flower of the golden trumpet tree (Handroanthus albus).

Chile

The national flower of Chile is the copihue (Lapageria rosea).

Colombia
Cattleya trianae is the national flower of Colombia and is the orchid which flowers in May. The May flower was chosen because the colors are the same as those of the Colombian flag.

Guyana
The national flower of Guyana is the Victoria regia lily (Victoria amazonica).

Peru
The national flower of Peru is the cantuta (also spelled kantuta or qantuta, from Quechua qantu). It can be found in the high valleys of the Andes in Peru and Bolivia.

Paraguay
The national flower of Paraguay is Mburucuyá.

Suriname
Called faya lobi ("fiery love") in Sranantongo, the jungle geranium (Ixora coccinea) is commonly considered a symbol of Suriname.

Uruguay

The national flower of Uruguay is the flower of the ceibo tree (Erythrina crista-galli).

Venezuela
The national flower of Venezuela is the Flor de Mayo (Cattleya mossiae), an orchid.

Subnational plants

Australia

Australian Capital Territory – Royal Bluebell (Wahlenbergia gloriosa)
New South Wales – New South Wales Waratah (Telopea speciosissima)
Northern Territory – Sturt's Desert Rose (Gossypium sturtianum)
Queensland – Cooktown Orchid (Dendrobium phalaenopsis)
South Australia – Sturt's Desert Pea (Swainsona formosa)
Tasmania – Tasmanian Blue Gum (Eucalyptus globulus)
Victoria – Pink (Common) Heath (Epacris impressa)
Western Australia – Red and Green Kangaroo Paw (Anigozanthos manglesii)

Norway
 Lily-of-the-valley was chosen as the county flower of Østfold
 Globe flower is the county flower of Troms

Pakistan

Islamabad Capital Territory – Hybrid Tea Rose (All Varieties)
Balochistan – Wild Woodland Tulip (Tulipa sylvestris)
Khyber Pakhtunkhwa – Lady's Tulip (Tulipa clusiana)
The Punjab – Sadabahar (Catharanthus roseus)
Sindh – Sindhi Lotus (Nelumbo indica)
Gilgit–Baltistan – Alpine Blue Star (Aquilegia coerulea)
Azad Jammu and Kashmir – Pink Snow Rose (Rhododendron ferrugineum)

United Kingdom

Each of the four countries of the United Kingdom has a traditional floral emblem:
 England – officially the Tudor rose or unofficially the red rose and English oak.
 Northern Ireland – the flax, orange lily, or shamrock.
 Scotland – the Scotch thistle, Scottish bluebell (harebell), or heather.
 Wales – the daffodil, leek, or sessile oak.

County flowers

A county flower is a flowering plant chosen to symbolise a county. They exist primarily in the United Kingdom, but some counties in other countries also have them.

One or two county flowers have a long history in England – the red rose of Lancashire dates from the Middle Ages, for instance. However, the county flower concept was only extended to cover the whole United Kingdom in 2002, as a promotional tool by a charity. In that year, the plant conservation charity Plantlife ran a competition to choose county flowers for all counties, to celebrate the Golden Jubilee of Queen Elizabeth II.

Plantlife's scheme is loosely based on Britain's historic counties, and so some current local government areas are not represented by a flower, and some of the counties included no longer exist as administrative areas. Flowers were also chosen for thirteen major cities: Belfast, Birmingham, Bristol, Cardiff, Edinburgh, Glasgow, Leeds, Liverpool, London, Manchester, Newcastle upon Tyne, Nottingham and Sheffield. The Isles of Scilly was also treated as a county (distinct from Cornwall) for the purpose of the scheme. The Isle of Man was included, even though it is not a county, but a self-governing territory outside of the United Kingdom with an existing national flower: the ragwort or cushag. The Channel Islands were not included.

A total of 94 flowers was chosen in the competition. 85 of the 109 counties have a unique county flower, but several species were chosen by more than one county. Foxglove or Digitalis purpurea was chosen for four counties – Argyll, Birmingham, Leicestershire and Monmouthshire – more than any other species. The following species were chosen for three counties each:
 Bog Rosemary Andromeda polifolia (Cardiganshire, Kirkcudbright and Tyrone)
 Cowslip Primula veris (Northamptonshire, Surrey and Worcestershire)
 Harebell Campanula rotundifolia (Antrim, Dumfriesshire and Yorkshire)
 Thrift Armeria maritima (Buteshire, Pembrokeshire and the Isles of Scilly)
And the following species were chosen for two counties:
 Grass-of-parnassus Parnassia palustris (Cumberland and Sutherland)
 Pasqueflower Pulsatilla vulgaris (Cambridgeshire and Hertfordshire)
 Common Poppy Papaver rhoeas (Essex and Norfolk)
In addition, Sticky Catchfly Lychnis viscaria was chosen for both Edinburgh and Midlothian, the county containing Edinburgh.

For most counties, native species were chosen, but for a small number of counties, non-natives were chosen, mainly archaeophytes.

Unofficial plants

Armenia
No plant or flower seems to be among the current official symbols. Some flowering plants from the area include Althaea armeniaca, Armenian Basket, Muscari armeniacum, Armenian Poppy, Armenian vartig (vargit), and Tulipa armena.

Azerbaijan
Azerbaijan currently has no official national flower. Traditionally, various regions have different designations where national symbols are concerned. The city of Shusha named the Khari Bulbul (Ophrys caucasica) the floral emblem of the Nagorno-Karabakh.

Belarus
The unofficial national flower of Belarus is wild blue flax, Centaurea.

China
China currently has no official national flower. Traditionally, various regions have different designations where national symbols are concerned.

In 1903, the Qing dynasty named the peony the floral emblem of the nation. The peony has long been considered a flower of wealth and honor in China.

The puppet state Manchukuo followed Japan's model of dual floral emblems: the "spring orchid" (Cymbidium goeringii) for the Emperor and the imperial household, and the sorghum blossom (Sorghum bicolor) for the state and the nation.

The plum blossom, meihua, has also been one of the most beloved flowers in Chinese culture.  The Republic of China government named the plum blossom as the national flower in 1964. The plum blossom is symbol for resilience and perseverance in the face of adversity, because plum blossoms often bloom most vibrantly even amidst the harsh winter snow.

The People's Republic of China, which has controlled mainland China since 1949, has no official floral emblem. There have been several petitions in recent years to officially adopt one. However, the government has not taken any action yet. A poll in 2005 showed that 41% of the public supports peony as the national flower while 36% supported the plum blossom. Some scholars have suggested that the peony and plum blossoms may be designated as dual national flowers.  In addition, the orchid, jasmine, daffodil and chrysanthemum have also been held as possible floral symbols of China.

Ecuador
No flower has been officially declared as a national symbol. Unofficially the rose and the orchid are claimed to hold that title.

Egypt
Both Blue Egyptian Lotus and White Egyptian Lotus are regarded as Egypt's national flowers, and they appear in many Ancient Egyptian paintings and monuments.

Guinea 
In a 2018 public vote Vernonia djalonensis was voted as the national flower of Guinea, a decision which is currently awaiting government approval

Italy 
Italy doesn't have an official floral emblem, though the Lily lilium is commonly cited. Other less common options are the Rose and the White poppy.

Japan

Japan's national government has never formally named a national flower, as with other symbols such as the green pheasant, which was named as national bird by a non-government body in 1947. In 1999, the national flag and anthem were standardised by law.

A de facto national flower for Japan for many is the sakura (cherry blossom), while a stylised depiction of a Chrysanthemum morifolium is used as the official emblem of the imperial family (Imperial Seal of Japan). The Paulownia blossom was also used by the imperial family in the past, but has since been appropriated by the Prime Minister and the government in general (Government Seal of Japan).

Netherlands
While the Netherlands does not have an official national flower, the tulip is widely considered to be its national flower.

France
While France does not have an official national flower, the fleur-de-lis, which was a symbol of the royal family, as well as the cornflower (blue), marguerite (white), and red poppy, which together represent the tri-colored national flag, are also generally treated as French national flowers.

Vietnam
While Vietnam does not have an official flower, four plants are traditional regarded as the four graceful plants, namely: the lotus, the pine, bamboo, and the chrysanthemum. The lotus (Nelumbo nucifera) is generally regarded as the unofficial national flower of Vietnam, as portrayed, for example, on their postage stamps.  In Vietnamese tradition, the lotus is regarded as the symbol of purity, commitment and optimism for the future.

See also
 Tudor rose

References

External links

 Plantlife County flowers page
 BBC coverage of the county flowers competition
 Provincial Floral Emblems of Canada - The Canadian Encyclopedia
 National Flowers
 Buzzle.com List of national flowers by country

Flowers in culture
Lists of national symbols